Cornell, California may refer to the following places in California:
Cornell, Los Angeles County, California
Cornell, Modoc County, California